PacificLight is a Singapore-based power generator and electricity retailer. It runs an 800MW plant, operated by PacificLight Power Pte Ltd, which uses Liquefied Natural Gas (LNG) as its primary fuel. In 2015, PacificLight generated 9% of Singapore’s total electricity needs.

PacificLight Energy Pte Ltd sells electricity to eligible consumers in Singapore, which includes manufacturing companies, shopping malls, SMEs, and small businesses such as coffee shops or retail outlets. Under the current government regulations, only non-residential customers with an average monthly electricity consumption of less than 2,000kWh are eligible. However, in 2018, the threshold will be reduced such that all Singapore electricity customers will be eligible to purchase electricity from a licensed retailer such as PacificLight Energy.

Description 
The S$1.2 billion Power Generation Facility located on Jurong Island, an established industrial area in the south-west area of Singapore, commenced operation in 2014.

The 800MW Power Generation Facility consists of two 400MW units, each comprising a Siemens SGT5-4000F combustion turbine and a Siemens steam turbine mounted on a single shaft, which operates in a combined cycle arrangement. The Combined Cycle Gas Turbine (CCGT) power plant is one of the most efficient power plants currently operating in Singapore and the first to be completely fuelled by Liquefied Natural Gas (LNG).

Shareholders 
PacificLight is owned 70:30 by FPM Power (Singapore) Ltd (HK) and PETRONAS International Corporation (Mauritius) Ltd.

FPM Power (Singapore) Ltd (HK) is a wholly owned subsidiary of FPM Power Holdings, a joint venture between First Pacific Company, a Hong Kong-based investment management and holding company, and Meralco PowerGen Corporation, a wholly owned subsidiary and power generation arm of Meralco.

PETRONAS International Corporation (Mauritius) Ltd, a wholly owned subsidiary of PETRONAS. PETRONAS is the national oil and gas company of Malaysia and is a fully integrated oil & gas corporation with operations along the hydrocarbon value chain in over 50 companies.

Clean Development Mechanism 
In October 2014, PacificLight’s 800MW power generation facility successfully registered as a Clean Development Mechanism (CDM) project making it the largest CDM project in Singapore. The generation facility is the only fossil fuel-based power project of the five Singapore registered CDM projects and demonstrates the company’s commitment to sustainability.

References

Electric power companies of Singapore